Teufelsschlucht is German for "devil's gorge" and may refer to:

 Devil's Gorge (Eifel), a gorge in the Eifel mountains near Echternach in Germany 
 A gorge in the Saalach Valley, Austria
 A gorge near Wehlen/Saxony, Germany
 Devil's Gorge (Switzerland), a karst gorge near Hägendorf in Switzerland
 A gorge in Alstedde near Ibbenbüren in Tecklenburg Land, Germany